Carlos Ulrrico Cesco (died 1987) was an Argentine astronomer. He lived most of his life in San Juan, Argentina. He was a well-known discoverer of minor planets credited by the Minor Planet Center (MPC) with the discovery of 19 numbered minor planets.

Family 
His older brother, Ronaldo P. Cesco, was a mathematician and celestial mechanician and director of the La Plata Observatory. They both studied at the Universidad de la Plata.

Legacy 

The Carlos Ulrico Cesco Observatory is named after him (formerly known as the Félix Aguilar Observatory). 

The outer main-belt asteroid 1571 Cesco, discovered by Miguel Itzigsohn at La Plata Observatory in 1950, was named after Carlos and Ronaldo Cesco. The official naming citation was published by the MPC on 6 June 1982.

References 
 

1987 deaths
20th-century Argentine astronomers
Discoverers of asteroids

Place of birth missing
Year of birth missing